As Night Comes, also known under the working title of Mischief Night, is a 2014 crime drama film that was directed by Richard Zelniker. The film is based on a script written by Zelniker and Ryan Koehn, who was still in high school while As Night Comes was written and filmed. It had a limited theatrical release on 14 November 2014 in Los Angeles before receiving a video on demand release on 5 December 2014. The film stars Luke Baines as a violent gang leader who takes another teenager under his wing.

Premise
Sean (Myko Olivier) is a young teen that has attracted the attentions of Ricky (Luke Baines) after he saves Sean from his abusive father. As Ricky is the leader of a gang of outcast teenagers called the Misfits, Sean falls right in with the group. However even among these outcasts Sean does not feel like he truly belongs, especially after hearing that the Misfits plan on staging a series of beatings to various townspeople that they deem deserving.

Cast
Luke Baines as Ricky Gladstone
Myko Olivier as Sean Holloway
Evanne Friedmann as Sarah David
Aku Pitt as Julie Rivera (as Stacia Hitt)
Kent Harper as Red Chapman
Jenna Marie Bowers as Tiffany Post (as Jenna Bowers)
Lane Smith Jr as Blane Connor
Ryan Shoos as Donny Chapman
Andrew Baxter as Ozzy Parker
Paulo Vincent-Brown as Dillon Thompson
Alexander Christensen as John Wallace
Jesse Kove as Brad Larson
Weston Cage as Bryan Roberts
Moe Irvin as Mr. Hayes

Reception
Shock Till You Drop panned As Night Comes, stating that  "Although the cast brings a bout of realism to the film, mostly because they’re nearly all fresh newcomers, it’s not enough to make it interesting" and that "Zelniker has a message he’s trying to portray, he just doesn’t managed to do so very well." The Los Angeles Times gave a mixed review, writing "As Night Comes has power, authenticity & tension by the incendiary climax but needs a more magnetic package." In contrast, the Pasadena Independent gave a wholly positive review and praised several elements in the film, including several of the actor's performance and noting the "exceptional production design, lighting and camera work which creatively blend to fill the screen with images that are simultaneously fascinating, haunting, beautiful, repellent and symbolic."

References

External links
 
 
 

2014 films
2014 crime drama films
2014 crime thriller films
2014 thriller drama films
2010s gang films
American crime drama films
American crime thriller films
American gang films
American thriller drama films
Films scored by John Swihart
2010s English-language films
2010s American films